Aleksandr Petrovich Kochetkov (28 October 1933  – 1 July 2015) was a Russian football player and coach.

Career
Born in Moscow, Kochetkov played professional football for SKA Khabarovsk and Luch Vladivostok. After he retired from playing, Kochetkov became a football manager. He led Amur Blagoveshchensk to its first Russian Second Division championship in 1971.

Death
Kochetkov died in July 2015.

References

External links
 

1933 births
Footballers from Moscow
2015 deaths
Soviet footballers
FC SKA-Khabarovsk players
FC Luch Vladivostok players
Soviet football managers
FC Luch Vladivostok managers
FC Alga Bishkek managers
FC Spartak Vladikavkaz managers
FC Kuban Krasnodar managers
FC Sokol Saratov managers
Association football forwards